The Titulus Crucis (Latin for "Title of the Cross") is a piece of wood kept in the Church of Santa Croce in Gerusalemme in Rome which is claimed to be the  (title panel) of the True Cross on which Jesus Christ was crucified. It is venerated by some Catholics as a relic associated with Jesus. Its authenticity is disputed, with some scholars confirming a plausible authenticity,
Carsten Peter Thiede suggested that the Titulus Crucis is likely to be a genuine part of the Cross, written by a Jewish scribe. He cites that the order of the languages match what is historically plausible rather than the order shown in the canonical New Testament because had it been a counterfeit, the forger would surely have remained faithful to the biblical text. Joe Nickell refers to this argument as "trying to psychoanalyze the dead," saying that "Forgers—particularly of another era—may do something cleverer or dumber or simply different from what we would expect."

In 2002, the Roma Tre University conducted radiocarbon dating tests on the artifact, and it was shown to have been made between 980 and 1146 AD. The uncalibrated radio-carbon date was 1020 ± 30 BP, calibrated as AD 996–1023 (1σ) and AD 980–1146 (2σ), using INTCAL98. These results were published in the peer-reviewed journal Radiocarbon. The Titulus Crucis recovered from the residence of Helena is therefore most likely a medieval artifact; an Italian classical scholar Maria Rigato discussed a possibility that it is a copy of the now-lost original.

See also
Relics associated with Jesus
Arma Christi
Crown of thorns
Holy Nail
Holy Sponge
Lance of Longinus
True Cross

Notes

References

External links
Rosary Workshop on the Titulus Crucis

Relics associated with Jesus
Forgery controversies
Latin words and phrases
Christian terminology